The Snare is a 1918 British silent romance film directed by Frank Wilson and starring Violet Hopson, George Foley and Trevor Bland. The screenplay concerns a woman marries a millionaire who likes to go poaching.

Cast
 Violet Hopson as Diane  
 George Foley as Lord Marston  
 Trevor Bland as Hugh  
 James Lindsay as Carlton Flint

References

Bibliography
 Palmer, Scott. British Film Actors' Credits, 1895-1987. McFarland, 1988.

External links

1918 films
1918 romantic drama films
British romantic drama films
British silent feature films
Films directed by Frank Wilson
Films set in England
British black-and-white films
1910s English-language films
1910s British films
Silent romantic drama films